Janusz Krawczyk (17 December 1949 – 3 April 2021) was a Polish luger who competed in the late 1960s and early 1970s. He won the bronze medal in the men's doubles event at the 1971 FIL European Luge Championships in Imst, Austria.

References

List of European luge champions 

Polish male lugers
1949 births
2021 deaths
Sportspeople from Bielsko-Biała